Matías Alejandro Giménez (born 23 December 1984 in Apóstoles, Misiones) is an Argentine football winger. He currently plays for Argentinos Juniors.

Career

Giménez started his career with Tigre in 2003, while the club were still in the regionalised 3rd division of Argentine football.

In 2004–05, the club won both the league titles to secure promotion to the 2nd division and in 2007 the club were promoted to the Argentine Primera for their first season at the top level of Argentine football since 1980.

The Apertura 2007 was Tigre's first season in the Primera since 1980, and Giménez's first taste of top flight football. The club finished in 2nd place which was the highest league finish in their history.

On December 28, 2009, Giménez signed with Boca Juniors.

On January 12, 2011, Giménez signed with San Lorenzo de Almagro, after being trade by Boca for Diego Rivero.

On January 31, 2012, Giménez was loaned out to Belgrano.

Titles

References

External links
 Matías Giménez at BDFA.com.ar 
 Football-Lineups player profile

1984 births
Living people
People from Apóstoles
Argentine footballers
Association football wingers
Argentine Primera División players
Club Atlético Tigre footballers
Boca Juniors footballers
San Lorenzo de Almagro footballers
Club Atlético Belgrano footballers
Club Atlético Banfield footballers
Club Olimpia footballers
Argentine expatriate footballers
Expatriate footballers in Paraguay
Sportspeople from Misiones Province